Amanipodagrion gilliesi is a species of damselfly. Its monotypic genus Amanipodagrion was formerly in the subfamily Argiolestinae of the flatwing damselfly family (Megapodagrionidae). As a result of molecular phylogenetic studies by Bybee et al. in 2021, it is now in its own family, Amanipodagrionidae.

This species is commonly known as the Amani flatwing. It has a slender dark-coloured abdomen with a white tip, and males have a dark wing band. This insect is endemic to a  stretch of stream in the Amani-Sigi Forest Reserve in the eastern Usambara Mountains in Tanzania. Because of its small area of occupation and the continuing destruction of the mountain forests in the area, the International Union for Conservation of Nature has assessed the conservation status of the Amani flatwing as being "critically endangered".

Description 
The Amani flatwing has a long, extremely slender abdomen, which is darkly coloured with a conspicuous white tip. Its wings are distinctly narrower at their base than at their tip, and the males have a broad brown band close to their wing tips.

Range 
It is endemic to the Amani Sigi Forest of the East Usambara Mountains from Tanzania. The Amani flatwing population appears to be largely confined to a 500 meter long stream in the Amani-Sigi Forest Reserve, although a single male has been found outside of this reserve.

Habitat 
Adult damselflies occur along clear, fast-running streams that are heavily shaded by closed canopy vegetation. Its natural habitats are subtropical or tropical moist lowland forests and rivers.

Threats 
Amanipodagrion gilliesi is now critically endangered due to destruction and degradation of its habitat. There has been almost a complete destruction of the low-altitude forest across East Africa, mainly for conversion to agricultural land. The few remaining forests of the East Usambara Mountains where the Amani flatwing is found are under considerable pressure. The main, viable subpopulation of Amani flatwings is relatively safe within the Amani-Sigi Forest Reserve, any other subpopulations within the vicinity are either already extinct or maybe on the verge of extinction as a result of human encroachment, deforestation and water pollution. Also the protected population of Amani flatwings leads a relatively precarious existence, containing fewer than an estimated 250 mature individuals.

Conservation 
The stream around which the one remaining viable population lives is protected within the forest reserve in the East Usambara Conservation Area, and is therefore relatively safe from any danger. Any changes to this stream could result in the extinction of Amanipodagrion gilliesi. It has been advocated that an extensive survey of the whole area is urgently needed to locate any further remaining populations. This species is very close to becoming extinct. Dragonflies and damselflies can't survive well in captivity.

References

Further reading
 
 
 

Endemic fauna of Tanzania
Insects of Tanzania
Monotypic Odonata genera
Taxa named by Elliot Pinhey
Taxonomy articles created by Polbot